Trousdale may refer to:

Places in the United States
Trousdale Estates, Beverly Hills, California
Trousdale, Kansas
Trousdale, Oklahoma
Trousdale County, Tennessee
Trousdale Place, former home of Tennessee governor William Trousdale

Vessels
USS Trousdale (AKA-79)

People with the surname
Ann Wagner née Trousdale (born 1962), American politician and diplomat
Chris Trousdale (1985–2020), American pop singer and actor
Gary Trousdale (born 1960), American animated movie director
William Trousdale (1790–1872), governor of Tennessee
Paul Trousdale (1915–1990), American real estate developer